Dupontia is a genus of Arctic and Subarctic plants in the grass family.

Species
The only known species is Dupontia fisheri, common name tundragrass. It is native to northern Canada (Labrador, Quebec, Ontario, Manitoba, + the 3 Arctic Territories), plus Alaska, Greenland, Svalbard, and Russia (Asian + European).

formerly included
see × Arctodupontia, Graphephorum
 Dupontia cooleyi – Graphephorum melicoides
 Dupontia × scleroclada – × Arctodupontia scleroclada

References

Pooideae
Flora of the Arctic